Illano is one of four parishes (administrative divisions) in San Martín de Oscos, a municipality within the province and autonomous community of Asturias, in northern Spain.

Villages and hamlets
 Arruñada (A Arruñada)
 Arne (El Arne)
 San Pedro de Ahio (San Pedro Io)

References

Parishes in San Martín de Oscos